The Treaty of Turkeytown, also known as the Treaty with the Cherokee and the Treaty of Chickasaw Council House was negotiated on 14 September 1816, between delegates of the former Cherokee Nation on the one part and Major General Andrew Jackson, General David Meriwether and Jesse Franklin, Esq., who served as agents of the United States in the capacity of "commissioners plenipotentiary", on the other part.  Conducted following the Creek War, the initial meeting was held at the Chickasaw Council House and stipulated a further meeting on 28 September 1816, to be conducted at "Turkey's Town", on the Coosa River, near the present day town of Centre, in Cherokee County, Alabama.  The treaty was ratified by the Cherokee Nation at Turkeytown on 4 October 1816, and signed by Pathkiller, then Principal Chief of the Cherokee Nation.

The Treaty of Turkeytown ceded certain Cherokee lands to the United States and provided for a one-time payment of $5,000 to the Cherokee for improvements to be made to the land; as well as an annuity of $6,000.00 per year for a term of ten years

Notes 
Centre, Alabama is the countyseat of Cherokee County, Alabama.

Cherokee Nation (1794–1907)
Turkeytown
Native American history of Tennessee